A sandpit (most Commonwealth countries) or sandbox (US and Canada) is a low, wide container or shallow depression filled with soft (beach) sand in which children can play. Sharp sand (as used in the building industry) is not suitable for such use. Many homeowners with children build sandpits in their backyards because, unlike most playground equipment, they can be easily and cheaply constructed.

History
German sand gardens were the first organization of children's play in public spaces. The German "sand gardens" were an 1850 offshoot of Friedrich Fröbel's work on kindergartens. Sand gardens were introduced to America by Marie Elizabeth Zakrzewska, starting in her home city of Boston. Inspired by the German sand gardens she observed while visiting Berlin in the summer of 1885. Joseph Lee is considered the "founder of the playground movement."

Physical description

The "pit", or "box" itself is simply a container for storing the sand so that it does not spread outward across lawns or other surrounding surfaces. Boxes of various shapes are often constructed from planks, logs, or other large wooden frames that allow children easy access to the sand and also provide a convenient place to sit. Small sandpits are also available commercially. These are usually made from plastic or wood and are often shaped like an animal or other objects familiar to children.

They sometimes also have lids to cover the sand when not in use, so that passing animals cannot contaminate the sand by urinating or defecating in it. Having lids also prevents the sand in outdoor sandpits from getting wet when it rains, although some dampness is often desirable as it helps the sand hold together. Prefabricated sandpits may also be used indoors, especially in day care facilities. Materials other than sand are also often used, such as oatmeal, which are necessarily non-toxic and light enough to easily vacuum up.

Sandpits can have a solid bottom or they can be built directly onto the soil. The latter allows free drainage (which is useful if the top is open) but can lead to contamination of the sand with soil if the children dig down to the ground.

The sand gets dirty over time and is eventually replaced. Many schools and playgrounds in North America have replaced sand around play structures with a wood chip mixture, as it is cheaper. It also prevents health risks, such as ringworm, that would potentially come from traditional sandboxes, due to other animals, such as raccoons, being able to use the sandpits, and spreading parasites.

See also
Borrow pit
Japanese rock garden
Outdoor playset
Sand art and play

References

External links 

 
 Example of Wooden Sand Pit / Sand Box

Childhood
Playground equipment
Sand
Play (activity)